Akçakale is a town and district of Şanlıurfa Province, in southeastern Turkey.

Akçakale forms a divided city with Tell Abyad in Syria, maintaining a border crossing. The Mayor is Mehmet Yalçınkaya (AKP). The current District Governor is Hamza Özer.

Syrian Civil War

On October 3, 2012, Akçakale was hit by shells from across the Syrian border in Tell Abyad, killing five civilians. In October 2014, there was an Islamic State in Iraq and the Levant presence in the town, due to the porous nature of the border at that time between Akçakale and Tell Abyad, which was then part of the Islamic State.

Transportation 
Akçakale is at the southern end of the TUR-D-885 highway.

Sport 
The Akçakale Belediyespor plays in the Akçakale Ilçe Stadium and competes currently in the Turkish amateur league.

Climate 
Akçakale has a hot-summer Mediterranean climate (Köppen climate classification: Csa).

References 

Populated places in Şanlıurfa Province
Districts of Şanlıurfa Province
Divided cities on the Turkish-Syrian border
Syria–Turkey border crossings
Arab settlements in Turkey